The WAGR F class was a class of 4-8-0 heavy goods steam locomotives operated by the Western Australian Government Railways (WAGR) between 1902 and 1970.

History
A total of 57 F class were built in three batches, fifteen in 1902, twelve in 1912 and thirty in 1913. The first batch was built by Dübs & Co, and the other two by its successor, the North British Locomotive Company. The class was designed by T.F. Rotheram, Chief Mechanical Engineer of the WAGR from 1900 to 1903. It was an enlarged version of the New Zealand Railways' B class, which had been designed under Rotherham's direction in 1896. The class was introduced to replace the K class on the Eastern Goldfields Railway. After World War II they were replaced as main line locomotives by the S and V classes.

The last two engines of the second batch, 366 and 367, were delivered with Schmidt superheaters, and were the first superheated locomotives to enter service in Western Australia. They were designated as class Fs. Between 1924 and 1948, all bar 398, 401, 403 and 415 were retrofitted with superheaters, and reclassified as Fs class engines. Some were renumbered in 1949/1950. Towards the end of their lives, some had their superheaters removed as an economy measure.

Two have been preserved, F452 at Collie and Fs460 at the Western Australian Rail Transport Museum.

Class lists
The numbers and periods in service of each member of the F class were as follows:

Namesake
The F class designation was reused in the 1960s when the F class diesel locomotives were acquired with the Midland Railway of Western Australia.

See also

Rail transport in Western Australia
List of Western Australian locomotive classes

References

Notes

Cited works

External links

Dübs locomotives
NBL locomotives
Railway locomotives introduced in 1902
F WAGR class
3 ft 6 in gauge locomotives of Australia
4-8-0 locomotives
Freight locomotives